This Time Next Year is an Australian reality television show based on the British show of the same name. Hosted by Karl Stefanovic, it premiered on 31 July 2017 on the Nine Network.

In August 2017, the series was renewed for a second season with applications closing by 8 December 2017, with the season airing on 12 August 2019.

Premise
The series sees participants make a pledge to attain a personal life goal (such as losing weight or starting a new career) that they will then attempt to achieve over the next year. The participant then appears to leave the set and then return moments later with one year having passed, the transition made seamless through editing. They are then interviewed about what they have achieved and the challenges they faced during the past year.

Series overview

Viewership

Season 1 (2017)

Season 2 (2019)

See also

 List of Australian television series
 List of programs broadcast by Nine Network

References

Nine Network original programming
2010s Australian reality television series
2017 Australian television series debuts
2019 Australian television series endings